Daw End Railway Cutting is an 8.1 hectare (20.9 acre) geological site of Special Scientific Interest in the West Midlands. The site was notified in 1986 under the Wildlife and Countryside Act 1981 and is currently managed by the Country Trust.

See also
List of Sites of Special Scientific Interest in the West Midlands

References
 Daw End Railway Cutting English Nature. Retrieved on 2008-05-26

Sites of Special Scientific Interest notified in 1986
Sites of Special Scientific Interest in the West Midlands (county)
Railway cuttings in the United Kingdom
Rail transport in the West Midlands (county)
Geology of the West Midlands (county)